Kongu Nadu, also known by various names as Kongu Mandalam and Kongu belt, is a geographical region comprising present day parts of western Tamil Nadu, southeastern Karnataka and eastern Kerala. In the ancient Tamilakam, it was the seat of the Chera kings, bounded on the east by Tondai Nadu, on the south-east by Chola Nadu and on the south by Pandya Nadu regions.

The region was ruled by the Cheras during Sangam period between c.1st and the 4th centuries CE and it served as the eastern entrance to the Palakkad Gap, the principal trade route between the west coast and Tamil Nadu. The Kosar people mentioned in the second century CE Tamil epic Silappathikaram and other poems in Sangam literature is associated with the Coimbatore region. The region was located along an ancient Roman trade route that extended from Muziris to Arikamedu.The Gangas of Talakad ruled it for over 5 centuries. The medieval Cholas conquered the region in the 10th century CE. It came under the rule of the Vijayanagara Empire by the 15th century. After the Vijayanagara Empire fell in the 17th century, the Madurai Nayaks, who were the military governors of the Vijayanagara Empire established their state as an independent kingdom. In the latter part of the 18th century, the region came under the Kingdom of Mysore, following a series of wars with the Madurai Nayak dynasty. After the defeat of Tipu Sultan in the Anglo-Mysore Wars, the British East India Company annexed Kongu Nadu to the Madras Presidency in 1799. The region was hard hit during the Great Famine of 1876–78 resulting in nearly 200,000 famine-related fatalities. The first three decades of the 20th century saw nearly 20,000 plague-related deaths and acute water shortage. The region played a significant role in the Indian independence movement.

Etymology
The name Kongunadu draws its origin from the term Kongu, meaning nectar or honey. Anthropological method traces the name of the area's early residents, who were known as kongar and they were believed to wear a garland made of konganam flowers, which are plentiful in this area. The name Kongu is likewise related to the Tamil word Kangu, which meant 'edge' or 'boundary.' Since this area served as a border to the Pandiya, Chola and Chera dynasties, it was likely given the name kangu, which was eventually transformed to Kongu. Kongu was later called as Kongunadu with the growth of civilization. Kongu Nadu is also believed to have come from "Kongadesam", "Konga" a variant of the term "Ganga", meaning "Land of the Ganges". The area is also known as Kongu Mandalam.

At various times, the region was known as Kongu Mandalam, Chola-Kerala Mandalam, Adhiraja Mandalam, Ezhukarai Nadu, Veera Chola Mandalam and Onbathukarai Nadu.

History
Kongu Nadu was one of the earliest and separate territorial divisions and home of the ancient Tamil people. The river Kaveri flows in southeastern direction through the region. Archaeological data from Kodumanal, a village on the banks of the Noyyal River, suggests the beginning of civilization around 4th century BCE. Kodumanal was situated on the ancient trade route between across the Palghat gap in the Western Ghats and yielded remains belonging to the Sangam age. Tamil Brahmi writings were found on coins, seals and rings obtained from Amaravathi river bed near Karur (also called as Karuvur in olden days), the erstwhile capital of the Cheras. A musical inscription in Tamil Brahmi was found in a cave in Arachalur, dating from the 4th Century CE and Iravatham Mahadevan writes that these are syllables used in dance.

The Kongu Country under the Cheras (400–600 CE)
The Kongu Nadu witnessed the rule of tribal chieftains during the Sangam period. 'Kongu Desa Rajakkal Charitai' mentions some dynasties which ruled this region. It was ruled by the Cheras during Sangam period between c. 1st and the 4th century CE. Chera dominance of the Kongu country began with the rule of the Palyanai Sel Kelu Kuttuvan who is the son of Uthiyan Cheralathan. The successive Chera kings had Karur as the capital of the Kongu country. The location of Karur assumed military significance.

After the Cheras, Rattas ruled the region. Then Gangas gained ascendancy after the Rattas. From the 7th century CE onwards, the conquest of the Kongu country had been the constant bone of contention between the Gangas and Pandyas.

Invasion by the Imperial Cholas of Thanjavur (900–1250 CE)
The medieval Cholas conquered the region in 10th century CE. The northern part of the Kongu country was brought under the Chola rule by Aditya I.  Raja Raja I in 990 CE defeated the Cheras at Kandalursalai and then proceeded against the Pandyas to annex Malai Nadu region which refers to the region of modern Coorg, Mysore and Kongu and the hills surrounding them. North Kongu was directly under the control of the Imperial Cholas till 1064 CE.

For almost 300 years from 1004 CE, the Kongu Cholas ruled autonomously. Chola monarch Raja Raja's general named, Kalimurka Vikrama was the founder of the dynasty and bore the title Konattar. The rulers of the 'Konattar' line adopted Chola titles and surnames. They came from the Konadu region (Pudukkottai) and ruled as a branch of Tanjore Cholas but were named as Kongu Cholas. The Kongu country came under the control of Vikrama Chola and Rajadhiraja, the two Kongu rulers who served as the later contemporaries of the Imperial Chola King Rajendra I and Kulottunga I, who ruled between 1070 CE and 1120 CE. Vikrama Chola III was the last ruler of the Kongu Chola line. During his time major parts of the Kongu region were under the Pandyas.

Imperial Pandyas Rule (1251–1318 CE)

From the 13th century CE, particularly after the death of Vikrama Chola II the Pandyas tried to dominate the Kongu region. They annexed some parts of Kongu Nadu. The inscriptions in the Srirangam temple speaks of the victory of Jatavarman Sundara Pandyan I over the Kongu Nadu. The glorious rule of the Pandyas came to an end with the death of Kulasekara Pandya  who ruled Kongu Nadu between 1268 CE and 1318 CE.

The Hoysalas conquered the Kongu Nadu and extended their rule. The Hoysala King Vira Someshwara had a matrimonial alliance with both Pandyas and Cholas. Vira Ballala III, successor of Vira Someshwara ruled the region. After the decline of the Hoysalas the Kongu region came under the control of the Delhi Sultanate.

Vijayanagara Rule (1358–1667 CE)

The Vijayanagara rulers in the course of a series of campaigns succeeded in overthrowing the Muslims, and they held the title Mahamandaleshwar and ruled the whole of South India. It was at this time that the Ummathur chieftains were apparently governing the dominion of Vijayanagara in Karnataka and Kongu region. The Umattur chieftains seem to have ruled over the Kongu country from 1446 to 1520 CE more or less peacefully rebuilding ruined temples and rehabilitating ruined towns damaged during the Muslim rule. Their rule ended when Krishnadevaraya (1509 CE–1529 CE) of Tuluva dynasty ascended to power. The first record comes from Kokkarayanpettai (Salem district) which describes him as Rajakkal Tambiranar. In the 1550s, Madurai Nayaks, who were the military governors of the Vijayanagara Empire, took control of the region.

British India Period

After the Vijayanagara Empire fell in the 17th century, the Nayaks established their state as an independent kingdom and they introduced the Palayakkarar system. In the latter part of the 18th century, the region came under the Kingdom of Mysore, following a series of wars with the Madurai Nayak dynasty. After the defeat of Tipu Sultan in the Anglo-Mysore Wars, the British East India Company annexed the region to the Madras Presidency in 1799. The region played a prominent role in the Second Poligar War (1801), when it was the area of operations of Dheeran Chinnamalai who fought against the rule of British East India Company.

Culture
Traditionally, people of the Kongu Nadu region upheld the Tirukkural with utmost reverence. The Tirukkural remained the chief administrative text of the region during the medieval period. Several Kural inscriptions and other historical records are found across the Kongu Nadu region. The 15th-century Jain inscriptions in the Ponsorimalai near Mallur in Salem district bear couplet 251 from the "Shunning meat" chapter of the Kural text, "தன்னூன் பெருக்கற்குத் தான்பிறி தூனுண்பா னெங்ஙன மாளு மருள்" ("How can he be kindly who fattens himself on others' fat?"), carved out on a rock in five lines, indicating that the people of the Kongu Nadu region practiced ahimsa and non-killing as chief virtues. The 1617 CE Poondurai Nattar scroll in Kongu Nadu, the 1798 CE Palladam Angala Parameshwari Kodai copper inscriptions in Naranapuram in Kongu Nadu, the 18th-century copper inscriptions found in Kapilamalai near Kapilakkuricchi town in Namakkal district, Veeramudiyalar mutt copper inscriptions in Palani, Karaiyur copper inscription in Kongu Nadu, and the Palayamkottai records are some of the other Kural inscriptions found across the region.

While many believe that Sati (practice) was confined to northern regions of India, historians have discovered that the ancient region of Kongu Nadu had the largest number of Sati in South India.

Religion
The Kongu region held a prominent place in the history of Saivism owing to the fact that the people and the king offered significant support to Saivism. Vaishnavism has grown steadily in some areas. Due to the general renowned Saiva saints who existed during this time, the kings of the Kongu region leaned more towards Saivism. Because of the complete faith in the effectiveness of Saiva worship and the development of Saivism in the area, the northern half of the area got more impetus in religious history.

Geography

The entire Kongu region has an approximate size of 7,500 square miles and includes present day districts of Tamil Nadu, namely Coimbatore, Tirupur,Erode,Dharmapuri, Krishnagiri,Salem,Namakkal,Karur,Dindigul, parts of Trichy,  as well as certain sections of Madurai. It shares its western and northern borders with states of Kerala and Karnataka. Some parts of Palakkad District in the state of Kerala and parts of Chamarajanagar District in the state of Karnataka also fall under the region.

The Western Ghats mountain range passes through the region with major rivers Kaveri, Bhavani, Amaravati and Noyyal flowing through the region. Palghat Gap, a mountain pass connects the neighbouring state of Kerala to the region.

Language

Tamil is the sole official language while English is an additional official language for communication purposes. Kongu Tamil (Kongalam or Kongappechu) is the dialect of Tamil language that is spoken in Kongu Nadu, which is the western region of Tamil Nadu. Badaga is spoken by approximately 130,000 people in the Nilgiri Hills of Kongu Nadu region. Toda, Irula, Kota are some of the languages spoken by tribal population of the Nilgiris district. A very small population speaks Malayalam, Kannada and Telugu in some border areas.

Economy

Kongu Nadu had a flourishing economy from ancient times and had trade contacts with foreign nations. Kodumanal was a 2,500-year-old industrial colony discovered by archaeologists. The region was located along an ancient Roman trade route that extended from Muziris to Arikamedu. A Chola highway called Rajakesari Peruvazhi ran through the region.

Cuisine
Kongu Nadu cuisine is predominantly South Indian with rice as its base and a collection of exotic recipes being created by the people residing in the Kongu region. As it is also native to an arid area, the cuisine includes cereals like Cholam, Kambu, Kezhvaragu, and different kinds of pulses and sesame. Food is served over a banana leaf. Eating on a banana leaf is an old custom and imparts a unique flavour to the food and is considered healthy. Idly, dosa, paniyaram and appam are popular dishes. Kongu Nadu cuisine does not involve marination of any raw material and as a result the food has a different taste and unique texture. The best quality turmeric is grown in the region and this is an important ingredient in the cuisine. Turmeric is added into curries, which gives the product a deep yellow colour and an aromatic substance. The traditional Kongu people were mostly vegetarians for religious reason. Opputtu is a variant of Holige made with rice, chickpea, palm or cane jaggery, cardamom and ghee.

Caste issues 
The caste plays an important role in the Kongu region's mythology and history. Common myths and ideas contribute to the formation of a caste identity, which political leaders use to create shared identity.

Incidents of persecution against Dalits, ranging from violent assault to discrimination based on caste is widespread in the Kongu region. Caste related atrocities are frequently reported from the Kongu region. According to Lakshmanan, a professor at the Madras Institute of Development Studies, "In comparison to the southern or northern districts, the socio-economic and political divide between Dalits and other intermediary castes is enormous in the Kongu area." Evidence, a Non-governmental organization called the Kongu region the "honour killing capital of Tamil Nadu" and said that the area is disturbingly gaining notoriety for honor Killings.

Statehood demand 
There is a demand for the formation of Kongu Nadu, which would include sections of Tamil Nadu's southwest, Karnataka's southeast, and Kerala's east. In 2021 the Bharatiya Janta Party's (BJP) Coimbatore North district decided to separate the area into a new state. Later BJP claimed that have no plans to separate Tamil Nadu. A caste based political outfit Kongunadu Munnetra Kazhagam and a caste organization Kongu Vellala Goundergal Peravai also supported the demand.

References 

Regions of Tamil Nadu
Proposed states and union territories of India